The New York Film Critics Circle Award for Best Director is an award given by the New York Film Critics Circle, honoring the finest achievements in filmmaking.

Winners

1930s

1940s

1950s

1960s

1970s

1980s

1990s

2000s

2010s

2020s

References

External links
 Official website

Awards for best director
New York Film Critics Circle Awards